John F. Reynolds (July 25, 1852June 20, 1934) was an American farmer and Republican politician.  He was a member of the Wisconsin State Senate (1899–1902) and State Assembly (1895–1898), representing Kenosha County.

Biography
Reynolds was born on July 25, 1852, in Randall, Wisconsin. His education included attending what is now the University of Wisconsin-Platteville. Reynolds was a farmer by trade.

Political career
Reynolds was elected to the Assembly in 1894 and 1896. He was a member of the Senate during the 1899 and 1901 sessions representing the 3rd District. Additionally, Reynolds was Chairman (similar to Mayor) of Randall. He was a Republican.

Reynolds died June 20, 1934, and was interred in Pontiac, Illinois.

References

1852 births
1934 deaths
People from Randall, Wisconsin
Republican Party Wisconsin state senators
Republican Party members of the Wisconsin State Assembly
Mayors of places in Wisconsin
Farmers from Wisconsin
University of Wisconsin–Platteville alumni